The 2004 UNCAF Interclub Cup was the 22nd edition of the Central American Club Championship and the 6th edition under its current name, UNCAF Interclub Cup.  C.S.D. Municipal from Guatemala, lifted its 4th title.

Qualified teams

First round

 Cobán Imperial 4–4 Plaza Amador on aggregate; Plaza Amador advanced on away goals.

 Olimpia won 6–0 on aggregate.

 Herediano won 6–0 on aggregate.

 Real España 4–4 Real Estelí on aggregate; Real Estelí advanced on away goals.

 Alianza won 5–2 on aggregate.

 FAS won 9–0 on aggregate.

Quarterfinals

 FAS won 6–2 on aggregate.

 Municipal won 4–1 on aggregate.

 Olimpia 3–3 Herediano on aggregate; Olimpia advanced on away goals.

 Saprissa won 5–0 on aggregate.

Final round

Standings

Municipal 2004 UNCAF champions

Municipal, Deportivo Saprissa, Olimpia advance to  2005 CONCACAF Champions' Cup quarterfinals.

References

UNCAF Interclub Cup
1
2004–05 in Honduran football
2004–05 in Guatemalan football
2004–05 in Costa Rican football
2004–05 in Salvadoran football
2004–05 in Nicaraguan football
2004–05 in Belizean football
2004–05 in Panamanian football